The Dutch Israelite Religious Community of The Hague (Dutch: Nederlands Israëlitische Gemeente Den Haag; NIG Den Haag) is the Ashkenazi Orthodox Jewish community in The Hague and is a member of the Nederlands-Israëlitisch Kerkgenootschap (English: Dutch Israelite Religious Community) (NIK).

The community has two synagogues, one in Scheveningen and one in The Hague. There is also a mikveh, a community centre CHAJ, educational facilities and a library. In The Hague there are also three Jewish cemeteries.

Activities
NIG Community The Hague is a Jewish Orthodox community which holds regular Shabbat activities as well as Jewish festivals year-round.
There are educational activities for all age groups and cultural meetings at the CHAJ centre.

Notable figures
Rabbi Shaul Hager Halevi a world wide influential Rabbi who lived in the 18th century and was known even in the far east.

Gallery

See also
 Rabbis from the Netherlands
 Orthodox Judaism
 History of the Jews in the Netherlands
 Nederlands Israëlitisch Kerkgenootschap
 Jewish Amsterdam
 List of Dutch Jews
 Nieuw Israëlitisch Weekblad
 Portugees-Israëlitisch Kerkgenootschap
 Sephardic Jews in the Netherlands

References

External links
 Nederlands Israëlitisch Kerkgenootschap
 Jad Achat webshop
 Joodse begraafplaats
 Chabad.org
 Joods Den Haag

Ashkenazi Jewish culture in the Netherlands
Ashkenazi synagogues
Organizations established in 1710
Orthodox Judaism in the Netherlands
Orthodox synagogues
Synagogues in the Netherlands
Buildings and structures in The Hague
1710 establishments in the Dutch Republic